"Vote 'Em Out" is a single by Willie Nelson, released on October 11, 2018, amidst the 2018 Senate election in Texas.

Background
In June 2018, Willie Nelson released a public statement criticizing the Trump administration family separation policy. During  his annual Fourth of July Picnic, Nelson was joined on stage by  Beto O'Rourke, a candidate in the 2018 Senate election in Texas. Nelson later gave his endorsement to O'Rourke, amid criticism from the conservative part of his fan base.

On September 29, 2018 Nelson offered a free concert in Austin, Texas, supporting O'Rourke's campaign efforts. At the end of the concert, Nelson debuted his new song "Vote 'Em Out". The track was released as a single on October 11.

On September 25, 2020 Nelson released an animated video on YouTube for "Vote 'Em Out" featuring cartoon characters are seen casting their ballots.

Sources

2018 songs
Willie Nelson songs
Political songs
Songs written by Willie Nelson
Song recordings produced by Buddy Cannon
2018 singles
Beto O'Rourke
Animated music videos